Hubert Jedin (17 June 1900, in Groß Briesen, Friedewalde, Silesia – 16 July 1980, in Bonn) was a Catholic Church historian from Germany, whose publications specialized on the history of ecumenical councils in general and the Council of Trent in particular, on which he published a 2400-page history over the years 1951–1975.

Early years 
He was born in Upper Silesia as one of ten children and studied theology in Breslau, Munich and Freiburg. He was ordained in 1924. In 1927 he went to Rome where he completed a biography of Girolamo Seripando. He returned to Germany in 1930, to teach Church History at the Catholic faculty  of the University of Breslau. Because of his Jewish mother, he was defined half-Jewish by the National Socialists. They stripped him of all academic titles  and prohibited him from working in public institutions in Germany. Jedin returned to Rome and worked there for the Görres Society. From 1936 until 1939, he worked for his diocese in Breslau. He returned to Rome after narrowly escaping deportation to the Concentration Camp at Buchenwald.

History of the Council of Trent 
In Rome, he lived at the Campo Santo Teutonico in the Vatican and was thus under the  protection of Pope Pius XII during the German occupation. He worked on a history of the Council of Trent, which he published in the years 1951–1976.  Jedin created the most comprehensive description  of the Council in his  History of the Council of Trent (Geschichte des Konzils von Trient with about 2400 pages in four volumes: 
 The History of the Council of Trent: The Fight for a Council  
 The History of the Council of Trent: The First Sessions in Trent 1545–1547  
 The History of the Council of Trent: Sessions in Bologna 1547–1548 and Trent 1551–1552 
 The History of the Council of Trent: Third Period and Conclusion

Vatican II 
After the war he was rehabilitated in Germany and accepted a professorship at the University of Bonn in 1948.  Pope John XXIII nominated him to assist in the preparation of the Second Vatican Council in 1960. He continued to work for the council until it ended in 1965.

Publications 
His work includes over seven-hundred titles, including forty books and 250 articles in journals. Jedin issued numerous publications on the council of Trent, which, in his view, determined the relation of Catholics and Protestants for centuries. He addressed issues of controversy, trying to give interpretations of ecumenical perspectives at that time. In addition, he oversaw the publication of a seven-volume Church History (1963-1979), an Atlas of Church History (1979), and the fundamental Lexikon für Theologie und Kirche (1957-1975, Encyclopedia for Theology and the Church). As a historian, he leaned on historicism as a method. As a theologian, he was an enlightened conservative, critical of some of the implementations of Vatican Two.

About Hubert Jedin 
 Lebensbericht. Mit einem Dokumentenanhang, hrsg. Konrad Repgen (= Veröffentlichungen der Kommission für Zeitgeschichte, Mainz 1984, 
 Heribert Smolinsky (Hrsg.): Die Erforschung der Kirchengeschichte. Leben, Werk und Bedeutung von Hubert Jedin (1900–1980) (= Katholisches Leben und Kirchenreform im Zeitalter der Glaubensspaltung, Bd. 61), Aschendorff, Münster 2001,

Notes

References
 Hubert Jedin, Kleine Konziliengeschichte, Herder Freiburg, 1960 
 Hubert Jedin, in Biographisch-Bibliographisches Kirchenlexikon Band 3 (Jedin–Kleinschmidt), Herzberg 1992, 

1900 births
1980 deaths
20th-century German Catholic theologians
Historians of the Catholic Church
Reformation historians
Participants in the Second Vatican Council
Roman Catholic writers
20th-century German historians
German male non-fiction writers
20th-century male writers
Knights Commander of the Order of Merit of the Federal Republic of Germany
Corresponding Fellows of the British Academy
20th-century German Roman Catholic priests